Weili Dai is a Chinese-born American businesswoman. She is the co-founder, former director, and former president of Marvell Technology Group. Dai is a successful female entrepreneur, and is the only female co-founder of a major semiconductor company. In 2015, she was listed as the 95th richest woman in the world by Forbes. Her estimated net worth is US$1.6 billion as of December 2021.

Early life 
Dai was born in Shanghai, China, where she played semi-professional basketball before moving to the US at the age of 17. She has a bachelor's degree in computer science from the University of California, Berkeley.

Career 
Dai was involved in software development and project management at Canon Research Center America, Inc.
Dai co-founded the American semiconductor company Marvell in 1995 with her husband Sehat Sutardja. She directed Marvell's rise to become a large company. While at Marvell, Dai worked on strategic partnerships, and marketed Marvell's technology for use in products across several markets.  Dai also works to increase access to technology in the developing world and served as an ambassador of opportunity between the US and China.
Dai served as chief operating officer, executive vice president, and general manager of the Communications Business Group at Marvell. She was corporate secretary of the board, and a director of the board at Marvell Technology Group Ltd.

Dai promoted partnership with the One Laptop Per Child program (OLPC) and women in science, technology, engineering, and mathematics (STEM) fields.

She sits on the board of the disaster relief organization, Give2Asia, and was named to a committee of 100 representing the Chinese Americans. The Sutardja Dai Hall at her alma mater, UC Berkeley, was named for Dai along with her husband Sehat Sutardja, CEO of Marvell and Pantas Sutardja, CTO of Marvell. Sutardja Dai Hall is home to the Center for Information Technology Research in the Interest of Society (CITRIS). In 2015, Dai was named to the Global Semiconductor Alliance's (GSA) board of directors,  Dai is a member of the executive committee for TechNet.

Dai co-founded the startup 'MeetKai' in 2018, which is focused on digital media technology (Artificial Intelligence/Metaverse) and as the "Official AI Partner" of the Los Angeles Chargers.

Awards 
Newsweek named Dai one of the "150 Women Who Shake the World." She has been profiled by CNN International for the Leading Women Innovator Series. In 2004, Dai was a recipient of the EY Entrepreneur of the Year award. On May 12, 2012,  Dai became the first female commencement speaker at the UC Berkeley College of Engineering. On August 22, 2012, Dai was on the Forbes list of "The World's 100 Most Powerful Women." In October 2012, she got an award from the non-profit organization Upwardly Global. In March 2013, Dai was honored with the Silicon Valley Entrepreneur of the Year Award in the Established Corporation category by the Chinese Institute of Engineers/USA-San Francisco Bay Area Chapter.

On May 23, 2013, Dai was No. 88 on the Forbes list of "The World's Most Powerful Women." On June 12, 2013, Dai was named a 2013 Most Influential Women in Embedded. On October 25, 2013,  Dai was honored with the New Silk Road Award by the California-Asia Business Council. On November 13, 2013,  Dai was awarded the Gold Stevie Award for Woman of the Year – Technology. On December 16, 2013, Marvell Co-founders Dr. Sehat Sutardja and Weili Dai were honored with the 2013 Dr. Morris Chang Exemplary Leadership Award  by the Global Semiconductor Alliance.

On May 28, 2014, Dai was named to Forbes most powerful women list. On September 8, 2014, Dai, was honored with a Gold award as the "Best Woman Professional of the Year" at the 2014 Golden Bridge Awards. On November 17, 2014,  Dai  had a Stevie award in 2017. In 2014, Dai got a Women World award.

On May 26, 2015, Dai was named as the 95th most powerful woman in the world by Forbes, her fourth consecutive year on Forbes list of "The World's Most Powerful Women." On August 5, 2015, Ms. Dai received a Gold recognition for "Technology Executive of the Year" from the 2015 International Best in Biz Awards. In 2015,  Dai was named a recipient of the "Keepers of the American Dream" by The National Immigration Forum and National Immigration Forum Action Fund.

Controversies 
In 2008, the company and its then chief operating officer–and the only member of its stock option "committee" during the period in question – Weili Dai paid fines, to the Securities and Exchange Commission over charges of false financial information to investors by improperly backdating stock option grants to employees, totaling $10 million and $500,000 respectively. Dai was forced to step down as executive vice president, chief operating officer, and a director but allowed to continue with the company in a non-management position.

In 2016, Dai and her husband, Sehat Sutardja, were fired from Marvell Technology Group, the company they had co-founded, after months-long investigation on a potential accounting fraud. The investigation found no fraud, however, it found that there were significant pressures from management to meet revenue targets and that internal controls were not fully followed and some revenues were booked prematurely early.

Personal life 
She is married to Sehat Sutardja. The couple have two children. They moved to Las Vegas, Nevada, US, after being dismissed from Marvell.

References

External links 
 An interview with Rory Moore of CommNexus, from CTIA 2010
 Pink Magazine interview, June 2009

Living people
American computer businesspeople
American technology chief executives
American technology company founders
American women company founders
American company founders
American women chief executives
American women computer scientists
American computer scientists
Businesspeople from Shanghai
Chinese emigrants to the United States
Former billionaires
Members of Committee of 100
Scientists from Shanghai
Semiconductors
UC Berkeley College of Engineering alumni
Women corporate executives
Year of birth missing (living people)
21st-century American women